Events from the year 1888 in France.

Incumbents
President: Marie François Sadi Carnot 
President of the Council of Ministers: Pierre Tirard (until 3 April), Charles Floquet (until 3 April)

Events
 16 March – France annexes the Polynesian kingdom of Raiatea and Taha'a.
 18 March – France annexes the Polynesian kingdom of Bora Bora.
 8 April – The town of Mende, Lozère, becomes the first French administrative centre to have electric light installed.
 July–August – Strike of laborers in Paris.
 8 July – Inauguration of Fontinettes boat lift on the Canal de Neufossé.
 12 July – Georges Ernest Boulanger and his supporters win seats in the Chamber of Deputies.
 2 October – Census of foreign residents.

Arts and literature
 21 February – Vincent van Gogh moves to Arles where he will be very productive as a painter.
 14 October – Louis Le Prince films the first motion picture, Roundhay Garden Scene, in Roundhay, Leeds, West Yorkshire, England (followed by Traffic Crossing Leeds Bridge).
 23 December – Having quarrelled with Gauguin, van Gogh cuts off the lower part of his own left ear, taking it to a brothel, and is removed to the hospital in Arles.
 Jeweller and glass designer René Lalique establishes the Lalique luxury goods business in Paris.

Births

January to March
 8 January – Pierre Wertheimer, businessman and racehorse owner (died 1965)
 9 January – Alfred Plé, rower and Olympic medallist (died 1980)
 20 January – Georges Marrane, politician (died 1976)
 4 February – Georges Girard, bacteriologist (died 1985)
 20 February – Georges Bernanos, author (died 1948)
 1 February – Henri Pequet, pilot, flier of first official airmail flight in 1911 (died 1974)
 28 February – Eugène Bigot, composer and conductor (died 1965)
 17 March – Henri Gance, weightlifter and Olympic gold medallist (died 1983)
 22 March – René Massigli, diplomat (died 1988)

April to June
 1 April – Lucien Callamand, actor (died 1968)
 2 April – Roger Ducret, fencer and Olympic gold medallist (died 1962)
 14 May – Lucien Berland, entomologist and arachnologist (died 1962)
 15 May – Jean Wahl, philosopher (died 1974)
 27 May – Louis Durey, composer (died 1979)
 5 June – Armand Léon Annet, colonial governor (died 1973)

July to December
 14 July – Jacques de Lacretelle, novelist (died 1985)
 26 July – Marcel Jouhandeau, writer (died 1979)
 31 July
 Léonce Crenier, Roman Catholic monk and theologian (died 1963)
 Jean Moreau, politician (died 1972)
 12 September – Maurice Chevalier, actor and singer (died 1972)
 16 September – Lucien Lamoureux, politician and Minister (died 1970)
 24 September – Georges Jean Marie Darrieus, aeronautical engineer (died 1979)
 30 September – Louis Lecoin, militant pacifist (died 1971)
 6 October – Roland Garros, aviator and World War I fighter pilot (died 1918)
 28 October – Stéphane Boudin, interior designer (died 1967)
 9 November – Jean Monnet, architect of European Unity (died 1979)
 23 November – Louis Antoine, mathematician (died 1971)
 3 December – François Dupré, hotelier, art collector and horse breeder (died 1966)
 16 December – Alphonse Juin, Marshal of France (died 1967)

Full date unknown
 Georges Bénézé, philosopher (died 1978)
 Camille Le Mercier d'Erm, poet, historian and Breton nationalist (died 1978)

Deaths
 18 January – Auguste Nicolas, Roman Catholic apologetical writer (born 1807)
 23 January – Eugène Marin Labiche, dramatist (born 1815)
 13 February – Jean-Baptiste Lamy, first Archbishop of Santa Fe (born 1814)
 20 February – François Perrier, general and geodesist (born 1835)
 22 February – Jean-Delphin Alard, violinist (born 1815)
 15 March – Léonard Morel-Ladeuil, goldsmith and sculptor (born 1820)
 16 March – Hippolyte Carnot, statesman (born 1801)
 29 March – Charles-Valentin Alkan, composer and pianist (born 1813)
 1 April – Jules Émile Planchon, botanist (born 1823)
 11 April – Louis-Frédéric Brugère, professor of apologetics and church history (born 1823)
 14 July – Antoine Étex, sculptor, painter and architect (born 1808)
 9 August – Charles Cros, poet and inventor (born 1842)
 16 November – Arsène Darmesteter, philologist (born 1846)

Full date unknown
 Pierre Bossan, architect (born 1814)
 Émile Sagot, (1805–1888) illustrator and lithographer

References

1880s in France